David Timothy Scarboro (3 February 1968 – 27 April 1988) was an English actor, best known for portraying Mark Fowler in the British soap opera EastEnders from the programme's inception in February 1985 until that April before appearing intermittently between 1986 and 1987.

Career

Early years
Scarboro made his acting debut in Good Neighbours, a television drama that aired on BBC in 1984 as part of a series of standalone teleplays for the anthology series Scene. 

In the same year he appeared as a member of troublemaker Gluxo Remington's gang in episodes of the school drama series Grange Hill. The script in his first episode called for Scarboro's character to chase Samuel "Zammo" McGuire across a children's playground in a park, and at one point jump over a see-saw. Following the jump, Scarboro accidentally stumbled and nearly fell — but somehow managed to right himself and keep going. He was really pleased that the scene was thought to look good and retained in the finished programme.

EastEnders 
From its inception in February 1985 until April of that same year, Scarboro played the part of Mark Fowler in the BBC soap opera EastEnders. The actor did not respond well to the sudden fame the role brought him, and later became very concerned when the writers decided that the character of Mark should become a racist.

Things came to a head one day when the script called for a scene where Mark was to deliver racist abuse to Paul J. Medford's character, Kelvin Carpenter. Scarboro firmly refused to play the scene. After this it was decided he should leave the show. His character was abruptly written out of the storyline; one morning his family arose to discover he had secretly moved away during the night. Mark was not seen nor heard from for several months.

In December 1985, Scarboro briefly returned to the series in a storyline where Mark was reunited with his parents. His parents had travelled to visit him in Southend-on-Sea where he had settled with an older woman who had children from an earlier relationship. Scarboro subsequently returned for brief stints in 1986 and 1987, but never returned to the series on a permanent or on-going basis. Scarboro's last appearance in the series was in the episode aired on Christmas Day, 1987.

Personal life
Elements of the UK tabloid press reported that Scarboro had been fired from the show for turning up late for filming and being unco-operative on set. Away from the series, Scarboro initiated libel proceedings after several national papers published inaccurate stories about his private life, but the press continued to pursue him and his family. The News of the World discovered that Scarboro was in a psychiatric unit, and published photographs of the place. Scarboro subsequently left the unit because he could no longer get adequate treatment, and inaccurate stories about his condition were being published.

Death
Scarboro was found dead at the bottom of Beachy Head on 27 April 1988. He was buried at St Mary's Church, Tatsfield, Surrey. At the inquest into his death, the coroner gave an open verdict. A 1988 BBC documentary made by Scene about his life titled My Brother David was presented by his brother Simon. Scarboro's parents left the UK after their son's death.

References 
Specific

General
My Brother David, a 1988 BBC documentary presented by David Scarboro's brother Simon and produced by Roger Tonge for Scene.

External links 

1968 births
1988 deaths
English male soap opera actors
Male actors from London
20th-century English male actors
Burials in Surrey